The Gentilly River (in French: rivière Gentilly) is a tributary of the south shore of the St. Lawrence River, in the administrative region of Centre-du-Québec, in Quebec, in Canada.

This river flows through the regional county municipalities (MRC) of:
Arthabaska Regional County Municipality: municipality of Saint-Louis-de-Blandford
Bécancour Regional County Municipality: municipalities of Manseau, Lemieux, Sainte-Marie-de-Blandford and Bécancour (city).

Toponymy 
The river was originally known as the "Little Stinking River" in the 17th century. The use continued during the first half of the 18th century. The adjective "petite" refers to the Bécancour River, which was originally referred to as the "(Great) Puante River". 

In his "History and General Description of New France", Pierre-François-Xavier de Charlevoix gives three hypotheses for the origin of the name of the river. The first simply alludes to the smell of water. The second would be the great presence of muskrats, which the Amerindians cannot bear the smell of. As for the third, he could allude to a battle between the Algonquins and the Iroquois near the river, whose rotting bodies would have remained in place for a long time.

As for "Gentilly", it appeared on a notice of enumeration of 1734. The name became widespread on maps from 1763. The name refers to the seigneury of Gentilly, granted to Michel Pelletier de La Prade in 1676.

Geography 

The Gentilly River has its source in a swampy area in Lemieux. It then crosses Soulard Lake and then takes a northwesterly direction to flow into the St. Lawrence River at Bécancour, eight kilometers west of Gentilly. On its course, the river only encountered one obstacle, the Thibodeau Falls, two meters high.

The flow of the river was calculated from an active hydrological station from 1972 to 1978.

Main attractions 
The "Parc régional de la Rivière-Gentilly" (Rivière-Gentilly Regional Park) offers various services and infrastructures for recreational and sports activities. This park, which is located on the banks of the Gentilly River, straddles the territory of Sainte-Marie-de-Blandford and Bécancour.

See also 
 List of rivers of Quebec

References

Further reading 
 .

Rivers of Centre-du-Québec
Arthabaska Regional County Municipality
Bécancour Regional County Municipality